Exira is a city in Audubon County, Iowa, United States, along the East Nishnabotna River and U.S. Route 71. The population was 787 at the time of the 2020 census.

History
The oldest town in Audubon County, Exira was founded in 1857. The town was named for Exira Eckman, daughter of Judge John Eckman from Ohio, who agreed to purchase a lot of property in the town if the town was named for his daughter.

The main industries in and around Exira are agriculture and agribusiness. Exira has a school, completed in 1959. There are four churches in the town.

On July 2, 1958, Exira was ravaged by the flooding of the East Nishnabotna River. Nineteen persons in the area lost their lives, 75 homes were destroyed and almost 20 businesses in the western part of Exira were damaged.

Exira is well known for its Fourth of July celebrations, which have been celebrated since 1861. The morning parade and the evening fireworks draw thousands of visitors to the town.

Geography
Exira is located at  (41.591617, -94.878247).

Demographics

2010 census
As of the census of 2010, there were 840 people, 381 households, and 217 families living in the city. The racial makeup of the city was 98.6% White, 0.2% African American, 0.1% Native American, 0.4% Asian, and 0.7% from two or more races. Hispanic or Latino of any race were 1.4% of the population.

There were 381 households, of which 21.0% had children under the age of 18 living with them, 42.8% were married couples living together, 10.0% had a female householder with no husband present, 4.2% had a male householder with no wife present, and 43.0% were non-families. 38.1% of all households were made up of individuals, and 20.2% had someone living alone who was 65 years of age or older. The average household size was 2.06 and the average family size was 2.63.

The median age in the city was 49.7 years. 16.4% of residents were under the age of 18; 7.1% were between the ages of 18 and 24; 19.4% were from 25 to 44; 27.8% were from 45 to 64; and 29.3% were 65 years of age or older. The gender makeup of the city was 43.1% male and 56.9% female.

2000 census
As of the census of 2000, there were 810 people, 362 households, and 211 families living in the city. The racial makeup of the city was 98.64% White, 0.25% African American, 0.12% Native American, 0.49% Asian, and 0.49% from two or more races. Hispanic or Latino of any race were 0.86% of the population.

There were 362 households, out of which 24.3% had children under the age of 18 living with them, 44.2% were married couples living together, 10.2% had a female householder with no husband present, and 41.7% were non-families. 38.1% of all households were made up of individuals, and 27.6% had someone living alone who was 65 years of age or older. The average household size was 2.08 and the average family size was 2.74.

In the city, the population was spread out, with 21.9% under the age of 18, 4.6% from 18 to 24, 19.0% from 25 to 44, 20.9% from 45 to 64, and 33.7% who were 65 years of age or older. The median age was 49 years. For every 100 females, there were 73.1 males. For every 100 females age 18 and over, there were 69.7 males.

The median income for a household in the city was $26,319, and the median income for a family was $32,222. Males had a median income of $25,917 versus $17,656 for females. The per capita income for the city was $15,124. About 9.9% of families and 11.7% of the population were below the poverty line, including 19.0% of those under age 18 and 13.0% of those age 65 or over.

Education
It is served by the Exira–Elk Horn–Kimballton Community School District. It was in the Exira Community School District until it consolidated into Exira-EHK on July 1, 2014.

Notable people

Ben F. Jensen (1892–1970) U.S. Representative for the former Iowa's 7th congressional district
Jack Pardee (1936–2013) NFL player and Head Coach

The Thomas B. Thielen Student Health Center at Iowa State University is named after former Exira resident, Thomas B. Thielen. Thielen served as vice president for student affairs at Iowa State University from 1977 to 1997.

The housing complex, Frederiksen Court, at Iowa State University is named for former Exira resident, Charles "Chuck" Frederiksen. His family moved to Exira, when he was three, where he attended and graduated from high school as valedictorian of his class. For nearly 50 years, Chuck had a distinguished career in the college and university housing profession. He became the Director of Residence in 1967 and retired in 1996. During his tenure at Iowa State, Chuck oversaw the construction, staffing and occupancy of many student housing and dining service facilities, including five residence halls and single and married family apartment complexes. Chuck received two significant recognitions during and following his retirement from ISU. The first was the establishment of the Frederiksen Leadership Award for student leaders living in university housing. The second recognition was the naming of a new housing complex, Frederiksen Court, in April 2002. Frederiksen Court currently houses more than 3,500 single undergraduate students in 29 buildings.

See also

T-Bone Trail
John D. Bush House

References

External links

Exira Community Schools
City-Data Comprehensive Statistical Data and more about Exira

Cities in Audubon County, Iowa
Cities in Iowa
1857 establishments in Iowa
Populated places established in 1857